Blaptinae is a subfamily of darkling beetles in the family Tenebrionidae. There are around 300 genera in Blaptinae, divided into 7 tribes.

In research by Kamiński et al. published in 2021, seven tribes were moved from Tenebrioninae into the newly resurrected subfamily Blaptinae. These tribes contained 281 genera and about 4000 species, about 50% of Tenebrioninae. The new classification was followed by Bouchard et al. the same year.

See also
 List of Blaptinae genera

References

Further reading

External links

 

Tenebrionidae